Narendra may refer to:

Places
Narendra (Karnataka) a village in Dharwad, Karnataka

People
Narendra Nath Datta, better known as Swami Vivekananda (1863–1902), an Indian Hindu Monk
Narendra Deva (1889–1956), also known as Acharya Narendra Deva, vice-chancellor of Banaras Hindu University.
Air commodore Narendra (1912-1951), Indian Air Force officer who died in an aircrash in 1951.
Narendra Nathwani (1913–????), Indian politician
Narendra Dabholkar (1945–2013), Indian medical doctor, rationalist and author
Narendra Pradhan (born 1947), Indian politician
Narendra Prasad (1946–2003), actor
Narendra Singh Negi (born 1949), Legendary singer from Uttarakhand
Narendra Modi (born 1950), Prime Minister of India
Narendra Karmarkar (born 1955), Indian mathematician
Narendra Hirwani (born 1968), Indian cricketer

Masculine given names
Hindu given names
Indian masculine given names
Gujarati given names